The Conservative Students' Association is a Norwegian students' association of the University of Oslo, located at Majorstuen, Slemdalsveien 7 together with the Norwegian Students' Society. It is politically conservative and is associated with the Conservative Party and the European Democrat Students. It was founded by Vilhelm Aubert on March 16, 1891, and is Norway's oldest students' association.

References

External links

University of Oslo
Conservative Party (Norway)
Conservatism in Norway
Student societies in Norway
Student organizations established in 1891
1891 establishments in Norway
Organisations based in Oslo
Student wings of political parties in Norway
Student wings of conservative parties